Tetrastemma is a genus of nemerteans belonging to the family Tetrastemmatidae.

The genus has cosmopolitan distribution.

Species

Species:

Tetrastemma aberrans 
Tetrastemma albolineatum 
Tetrastemma albomaculatum

References

Tetrastemmatidae
Nemertea genera